SS War Kitimat was a freighter built in Canada for wartime service during the First World War. She was steam-powered, with a hull made of wood.

She was built in New Westminster, BC.

The War Kitimat was run aground shortly after her launch, and was repaired in Victoria, BC. She made at least one voyage during wartime. When peace came she was redundant, and was sold, in 1919, to the Belgian shipping firm Lloyd Royal Belge S.A., which renamed her Serbier. On 12 January 1920 she was en route from Cartagena and Oran, bound for Antwerp, carrying zinc ore and general cargo, when she sprang a leak 80 nautical miles off Penmarch, Finistère. With her engine room flooded she was abandoned by her crew and left to sink. Her crew were rescued by the French vessel .

References

External links

Standard World War I ships
1918 ships
Maritime incidents in 1920
Shipwrecks in the Atlantic Ocean
Ships built in British Columbia
Merchant ships of the United Kingdom
Merchant ships of Belgium